Joana Amorim Cortez dos Santos (born 11 January 1979) is a retired Brazilian tennis player.

In her career, Cortez won seven singles and 26 doubles titles on the ITF Women's Circuit. On 17 September 2001, she reached her best singles ranking of world No. 204. On 5 November 2001, she peaked at No. 115 in the doubles rankings.

Cortez represented Brazil at the 2000 Summer Olympics in women's doubles, reaching the second round with Vanessa Menga. A year previously, the pair won gold at the 1999 Pan American Games. Cortez won gold again in 2003, partnering Bruna Colósio, and in 2007 won bronze with Teliana Pereira in Rio.

Playing for Brazil at the Fed Cup, Cortez had a win–loss record of 23–14.

Cortez played and lost two doubles matches in Grand Slam events, at the 2001 US Open and in 2002 in Australia.

After retiring from the professional tour, she became a beach tennis player.

ITF finals

Singles: 15 (7–8)

Doubles: 61 (26–35)

References

External links
 
 
 
  

1979 births
Living people
Sportspeople from Rio de Janeiro (city)
Brazilian female tennis players
Female tennis players playing beach tennis
Tennis players at the 2000 Summer Olympics
Olympic tennis players of Brazil
Tennis players at the 1999 Pan American Games
Tennis players at the 2003 Pan American Games
Tennis players at the 2007 Pan American Games
Pan American Games gold medalists for Brazil
Pan American Games bronze medalists for Brazil
Pan American Games medalists in tennis
Medalists at the 1999 Pan American Games
Medalists at the 2003 Pan American Games
Medalists at the 2007 Pan American Games
20th-century Brazilian women
21st-century Brazilian women